Hamburg is a village in Erie County, New York, United States. The population was 9,409 at the 2010 census. The village is named after Hamburg, a city in Germany. It is part of the Buffalo–Niagara Falls Metropolitan Statistical Area.

The village of Hamburg lies in the southeast part of the town of Hamburg and is south of Buffalo.

History 
The Village of Hamburg was incorporated in 1874 and had a population in 1880 of 758.

The Hamburg Downtown Historic District was listed on the National Register of Historic Places in 2012.

Geography
Hamburg is located at  (42.722759, -78.833853).

According to the United States Census Bureau, the village has a total area of 2.5 square miles (6.5 km), all land.

Hamburg lies at the junction of several major trucking roads, such as Lakeview Road, Boston State Road (Route 391), Sisson Highway (Route 75), South Park Avenue/Buffalo Street (U.S. Route 62), which becomes Gowanda State Road south of the village, and McKinley Parkway. Hamburg is east of the New York State Thruway (Interstate 90).

Eighteen Mile Creek flows south of the village to Lake Erie.

Demographics

At the 2000 census there were 10,116 people, 4,010 households, and 2,694 families in the village. The population density was 4,025.2 people per square mile (1,556.1/km). There were 4,144 housing units at an average density of 1,648.9 per square mile (637.5/km).  The racial makeup of the village was 98.64% White, 0.20% Black or African American, 0.15% Native American, 0.40% Asian, 0.15% from other races, and 0.47% from two or more races. Hispanic or Latino of any race were 0.75%.

Of the 4,010 households 33.5% had children under the age of 18 living with them, 55.4% were married couples living together, 9.1% had a female householder with no husband present, and 32.8% were non-families. 28.7% of households were one person and 15.3% were one person aged 65 or older. The average household size was 2.50 and the average family size was 3.12.

The age distribution was 26.4% under the age of 18, 6.0% from 18 to 24, 27.2% from 25 to 44, 23.9% from 45 to 64, and 16.4% 65 or older. The median age was 38 years. For every 100 females, there were 87.3 males. For every 100 females age 18 and over, there were 81.1 males.

The median household income was $51,239 and the median family income  was $63,180. Males had a median income of $43,395 versus $31,731 for females. The per capita income for the village was $23,371. About 2.8% of families and 3.0% of the population were below the poverty line, including 3.0% of those under age 18 and 2.7% of those age 65 or over.

Notable people 
Michael Dubke, former White House communications
Jack Kemp, American politician and professional football player.

References

External links
 Village of Hamburg official website

Villages in New York (state)
Buffalo–Niagara Falls metropolitan area
Villages in Erie County, New York